Clytus carinatus is a putative species of beetle in the family Cerambycidae. It was described by Laporte and Gory in 1835, but its identity is unknown: it is presently considered incertae sedis, so it is unclear what genus it belongs to, and it is likely to be a synonym of some other described cerambycid species from North America.

References

Clytini
Beetles described in 1835